Elena Lissacheva  (born 25 November 1973) is a former Russian footballer who played as a midfielder for the Russia women's national football team. She was part of the team at the 1999 FIFA Women's World Cup.

References

External links
 

1973 births
Living people
Soviet women's footballers
Russian women's footballers
Russia women's international footballers
People from Cheboksary
Sportspeople from Chuvashia
1999 FIFA Women's World Cup players
Women's association football midfielders
Ryazan-VDV players
FC Lada Togliatti (women) players
Russian Women's Football Championship players